Durham County Memorial Stadium is an 8,500-seat multi-purpose stadium located in Durham, North Carolina.  Originally built in 1958, the stadium underwent significant renovations in 2010 that updated the facility to include an artificial turf lined for soccer, football and lacrosse and a track and field facility with an eight lane track.  Durham County Memorial Stadium is the home field of Northern Durham High School Football, Carolina Flyers of the AUDL and Tobacco Road FC of USL-2.  The stadium is also used as a special events facility hosting local, regional and national events.

The stadium hosted Shaw University Football from 2007 to 2018, despite the school's location in neighboring Wake County.

Durham County Memorial Stadium is managed by the Durham County Memorial Stadium Authority and owned by the County of Durham.

Notable events
 NAIA Football National Championship 2021-2022
 USATF Youth National Championship 2019 
 CIAA Football Conference Championship 2008-2012 and 2014-2015
State Games of North Carolina (Track and Field and Lacrosse)

References

External links
 Durham County Memorial Stadium 
Open Durham - Durham County Stadium Site History

Athletics (track and field) venues in North Carolina
College football venues
Soccer venues in North Carolina
Sports venues in Durham, North Carolina
Multi-purpose stadiums in the United States
National Premier Soccer League stadiums
American football venues in North Carolina
1960 establishments in North Carolina
Sports venues completed in 1960
High school football venues in the United States